Allen Howard (born 1953) is an American entrepreneur that co-founded NuTech Energy Alliance, LTD in 1997. Based in Houston, Texas, NuTech is a Reservoir Intelligence company that services the upstream Oil and Gas industry.

References

1953 births
Living people
American company founders
Place of birth missing (living people)
Date of birth missing (living people)